Weesatche is an unincorporated community in northern Goliad County, Texas, United States.  It lies along State Highway 119 north of the city of Goliad, the county seat of Goliad County.  Its elevation is 233 feet (71 m).  Although Weesatche is unincorporated, it has a post office, with the ZIP code of 77993. The community is part of the Victoria, Texas Metropolitan Statistical Area.

History
Weesatche was founded around the year 1850 under the name of Middletown, being halfway between Clinton and Goliad, and its post office was established on 1855-11-22.  However, confusion with a Middletown in Comal County led locals to rename the community after the sweet acacia tree; the community's name is a corruption of the plant's alternate name, huisache.  A post office under the name of Weesatche was opened in May 1860; although it closed during the Civil War, it was restored in 1870.

Public services
Local children have attended the schools of the Goliad ISD since Weesatche's schools were consolidated into it in 1963.  The community has a volunteer fire department.

Notable natives
Joseph Barnard, doctor and state legislator

References

External links
Profile of Weesatche from the Handbook of Texas Online

Unincorporated communities in Goliad County, Texas
Unincorporated communities in Texas
Victoria, Texas metropolitan area
Populated places established in 1850
1850 establishments in Texas